Denise Danks is an English novelist, journalist and screenwriter. She has twice been shortlisted for the Crime Writers' Association Gold Dagger. She is also a past winner of the Chandler/Fulbright award, and is notable for being the first female writer to receive it. Previous winners of the award include Scottish writer Ian Rankin.

Bibliography
Georgina Powers
Phreak (1998, Victor Gollancz)
Frame Grabber (1992, Constable & Co)
Pizza House Crash (1989, Futura)
User Deadly (1989, Futura)
Baby Love (2001, Orion)
Better Off Dead (1991, Macdonald & Co)
Wink a Hopeful Eye (1993, Macmillan)
Other

Torso (1999, Victor Gollancz)

Short Stories

Right Arm Man collected in London Noir (1994, Serpent's Tail, edited by Maxim Jakubowski)

External links
profile at fantasticfiction.co.uk

English women novelists
English women journalists
British women screenwriters
English screenwriters
Year of birth missing (living people)
Living people
Women mystery writers
English women non-fiction writers